The Nicholls Colonels women's soccer team represents Nicholls State University in Thibodaux, Louisiana, United States. The school's team currently competes in the Southland Conference, which is part of the National Collegiate Athletic Association's Division I. Nicholls' first women's soccer team was fielded in 1998. The team played its home games at the 1,000-seat Nicholls Soccer Complex through the 2021 season.  For the 2022 season, the Colonels play at the newly constructed multi-purpose field at the Thibodaux Regional Sports Complex.  The team is coached by Robert Podeyn.

See also
Nicholls Colonels

References

External links
 

 
NCAA Division I women's soccer teams
Association football clubs established in 1998
1998 establishments in Louisiana